K189 or K-189 may refer to:

K-189 (Kansas highway), a state highway in Kansas
HMS Bergamot (K189), a former UK Royal Navy ship